The Copa del Generalísimo 1950 Final was the 48th final of the King's Cup. The final was played at Estadio Chamartín in Madrid, on 28 May 1950, being won by Atlético de Bilbao, who beat Real Valladolid 4-1 after extra time.

Details

References

1950
Copa
Real Valladolid matches
Athletic Bilbao matches